The 1973–74 Idaho Vandals men's basketball team represented the University of Idaho during the 1973–74 NCAA Division I men's basketball season. Members of the Big Sky Conference, the Vandals were led by eighth-year head coach Wayne Anderson and played their home games on campus at the Memorial Gymnasium in Moscow, Idaho. They were 12–14 overall and 5–9 in conference play.

No Vandals were named to the all-conference team; senior forward Steve Ton, senior guard Tyrone Fitzpatrick, and sophomore guard Steve Weist were honorable mention.

Anderson resigned shortly after the season, ending seventeen years in coaching at his alma mater. He  returned to Moscow in 1982 and resumed duties as assistant athletic director, and retired in 1994.

References

External links
Sports Reference – Idaho Vandals: 1973–74 basketball season
Idaho Argonaut – student newspaper – 1974 editions

Idaho Vandals men's basketball seasons
Idaho
Idaho Vandals men's basketball team
Idaho Vandals men's basketball team